Marlin Skiles (1906–1981) was an American composer of film and television scores.

Partial filmography
 Tahiti Honey (1943)
 Call of the South Seas (1944)
 The Lady and the Monster (1944)
 A Thousand and One Nights (1945)
 She Wouldn't Say Yes (1945)
 Rough, Tough and Ready (1945)
 Over 21 (1945)
 Gilda (1946)
 The Walls Came Tumbling Down (1946) 
 Gallant Journey (1946)
 Dead Reckoning (1947)
 The Doolins of Oklahoma (1949) (uncredited)
 The Boy from Indiana (1950)
 Flat Top (1952)
 Fort Osage (1952)
 The Rose Bowl Story (1952)
 Rodeo (1952)
 Wild Stallion (1952)
 Wagons West (1952)
 Pride of the Blue Grass (1954)
 Sudden Danger (1955)
 Canyon River (1956)
 The Young Guns (1956)
 Calling Homicide (1956)
 My Gun Is Quick (1957)
 The Disembodied (1957)
 Man from God's Country (1958)
 In the Money (1958)
 The Beast of Budapest (1958)
 Cole Younger, Gunfighter (1958)
 Quantrill's Raiders (1958)
 Fort Massacre (1958)
 Queen of Outer Space (1958)
 Joey Ride (1958)
 King of the Wild Stallions (1959)
 The Hypnotic Eye (1960)
 The Deadly Companions (1961)
 Gunfight at Comanche Creek (1963)
 The Strangler (1964)
 The Shepherd of the Hills (1964)
 Indian Paint (1965)
 Space Probe Taurus (1965 - as Marlin Skyles)
 The Violent Ones (1967)
 Dayton's Devils (1968)
 The Resurrection of Zachary Wheeler (1971)

References

Bibliography
 Alan Gevinson. Within Our Gates: Ethnicity in American Feature Films, 1911-1960. University of California Press, 1997.

External links

1906 births
1981 deaths
20th-century American composers